Medina Sidonia is a city and municipality in the province of Cádiz in the autonomous community of Andalusia, southern Spain. Considered by some to be the oldest city in Europe, it is used as a military defence location because of its elevation. Locals are known as Asidonenses. The city's name comes from Medina (Arabic for "city") and Sidonia (of Sidon) and means "City of Sidon".

Medina-Sidonia, one of Spain's most important ducal seats in the 15th century, produced an admiral, Alonso Pérez de Guzmán, 7th Duke of Medina Sidonia, who led the Spanish Armada against England in 1588. The title of Duque de Medina Sidonia was bestowed upon the family of Guzmán El Bueno for his valiant role in taking the town. The line continues and was led until March 2008 by the controversial socialist Luisa Isabel Álvarez de Toledo, 21st Duchess of Medina Sidonia (born 1936).

History

This city was most likely ancient Asido, an Iberian settlement which may have been founded by the Phoenicians, hence the later name Sidonia reflecting its foundation by Sidon. Its earliest phase is known through its coinage and its 2nd and 1st centuries BC issues bear the Latin inscription Asido but also Punic inscriptions such as 'sdn or b'b'l, with Herakles and dolphins being notable obverse and reverse designs.

By the 3rd century BC the Romans had gained control over much of southern Spain; once coming under Roman hegemony this site was later referred to as Asido Caesarina.
In 712 the town was conquered by the Muslim commander Musa ibn Nusayr, and became the capital of the province of Sidonia in the emirate of Spain. It returned to Christian hands with Alfonso X of Castile, in 1264, becoming a stronghold along the frontier with the last Muslim country in the Iberian Peninsula, the Kingdom of Granada. It was also the seat of several military orders.

In 1440, it became part of the lordship of the Dukes of Medina-Sidonia.

Main sights

The town is characterized by medieval walls and tidy, narrow cobbled streets flanked by rows of reja-fronted houses.
Sights include: 
The Castle (13th-15th centuries)
Roman archaeological complex (1st century AD)
Town Hall (16th century)
La Alameda (16th century)
Ducal Stables (16th century)
Church of Saint Mary the Crowned
Castle of Torre-estrella (13th century)

Gallery

See also
Duke of Medina Sidonia

References

Municipalities of the Province of Cádiz